Solar cycle 2 was the second solar cycle since 1755, when extensive recording of sunspot activity began. The solar cycle lasted 9 years, beginning in June 1766 and ending in June 1775.  The maximum smoothed sunspot number observed during the solar cycle was 193.0 (September 1769), and the starting minimum was 18.6.

Sunspot observations by Alexander Wilson during this period established the Wilson effect.

See also
List of solar cycles

References

2